Thalasseus, the crested terns,  is a genus of eight species of terns in the family Laridae.

It has a worldwide distribution, and many of its species are abundant and well-known birds in their ranges. This genus had originally been created by Friedrich Boie in 1822, but had been abandoned until a 2005 study confirmed the need for a separate genus for the crested  terns.

These large terns breed in very dense colonies on coasts and islands, and exceptionally inland on suitable large freshwater lakes close to the coast. They nest in a ground scrape.

Thalasseus terns feed by plunge-diving for fish, almost invariably from the sea. They usually dive directly, and not from the "stepped-hover" favoured by, for example, the Arctic tern.  The offering of fish by the male to the female is part of the courtship display.

These species have long thin sharp bills, usually a shade of yellow or orange except in the Sandwich tern and Cabot's tern where the bills are black with yellow tips in most subspecies. All species have a shaggy crest. In winter, the Thalasseus terns' foreheads become white.

Taxonomy
The genus Thalasseus was erected by the German zoologist Friedrich Boie in 1822. The type species was subsequently designated as the sandwich tern (Thalasseus sandvicensis). The generic name is derived from the Ancient Greek Thalassa meaning "sea".

List of species
The genus contains eight species:

An early Pliocene fossil bone fragment from the northeastern United States  closely resembles a modern royal tern. It may be an unexpectedly early (3.7–4.8 million years before present) specimen of that species, or an ancestral member of the crested tern group.

References

 
Bird genera